The 2014 Caribbean Cup is an international football competition that is scheduled to take place 11–18 November 2014. The competition is a qualifying tournament for the 2015 CONCACAF Gold Cup and Copa América Centenario.

Group A

Cuba
Head coach:  Walter Benítez

Curaçao
Head coach:  Etienne Sillie

French Guiana
Head coach:  Jaïr Karam

Trinidad and Tobago
Head coach:  Stephen Hart

Group B

Antigua and Barbuda
Head coach:  Rolston Williams

Haiti
Head coach:  Marc Collat

Jamaica
Head coach:  Winfried Schäfer

Notes
Wes Morgan was withdrawn from the squad prior to the competition starting and was replaced with Upston Edwards.

Martinique
Head coach:  Marianne Louis

References

Squads
Caribbean Cup squads